Despite the Falling Snow is a 2016 British Cold War espionage film directed by Shamim Sarif, adapted from her novel of the same name. Starring Rebecca Ferguson, Sam Reid, Charles Dance, Antje Traue, Oliver Jackson-Cohen, Thure Lindhardt and Anthony Head, the film was released in the United Kingdom on 15 April 2016.

Plot
The film is set in the post-Stalinist Soviet Union. A young Soviet woman, Katya, lost her parents during the Stalinist repressions. Though she pretends to be a communist, she hates the regime and spies for the Americans. Her friend Misha, who is a spy, also helps her obtain important information for the Americans. As part of her next assignment, she meets the young and good-looking Sasha, who belongs to the Kremlin elite. In order to spy on him, Katya ends up marrying Sasha but not everything is going to the plan. Katya soon falls in love with Sasha, and plans to defect to the United States with him. However, just before her trip to the US, Katya mysteriously vanishes. Sasha stays in America alone, and over the course of 30 years becomes a successful businessman in America. Many years afterwards, he visits a post-communist Russia seeking to solve Katya's disappearance. He and his niece Lauren work together, searching for clues. They then meet Misha, who has become an old alcoholic; he tells them what really happened to Katya.

Cast
 Rebecca Ferguson as Katya Grinkova / Lauren Grinkova
 Sam Reid as Alexander "Sasha" Ivanov (young)
 Charles Dance as Alexander "Sasha" Ivanov (older)
 Antje Traue as Marina Rinskaya
 Oliver Jackson-Cohen as Mikhail "Misha" Ardonov (young)
 Thure Lindhardt as Dmitri Rinsky
 Miloš Timotijević as First Man
 Anthony Head as Mikhail "Misha" Ardonov (older)

Production
The film was shot in Belgrade, Serbia. The score by Rachel Portman was performed by the City of Prague Philharmonic Orchestra.

Reception
On the review aggregator website Rotten Tomatoes, the film holds a 9% approval rating based on 22 reviews, with an average rating of 4.1/10. The website's consensus reads, "Despite the Falling Snows slick production and appealing cast struggle to elevate a feeble script, resulting in a Cold War thriller that never raises the temperature."

The film won three awards at the 2016 Prague Independent Film Festival including Best Feature Film, Best Actress (Rebecca Ferguson) and Best Supporting Actor (Anthony Head).

References

External links
 
 
 

2016 films
British independent films
2010s mystery thriller films
British mystery films
British spy films
British romantic drama films
Cold War spy films
Films directed by Shamim Sarif
Films scored by Rachel Portman
Films shot in Belgrade
2010s English-language films
2010s British films